Faddoul is a surname. Notable people with the surname include:

Charla Baklayan Faddoul (born 1976), American reality television personality
Ghassan Faddoul (born 1955), Lebanese long jumper and javelin thrower
Simon Faddoul (born 1958), Apostolic Exarch of the Maronite Catholic Apostolic Exarchate of Western and Central Africa